Apantesis eureka is a moth of the family Erebidae. It was described by Douglas C. Ferguson and B. Christian Schmidt in 2007. It has been found in the United States along the edges of the Great Basin in central Utah and in southwestern Idaho.

The length of the forewings is about 16.9 mm. There is a nearly complete set of pale bands on the forewings. The hindwings are orange red with a dark pattern. Adults are on wing from late April to mid-May.

This species was formerly a member of the genus Grammia, but was moved to Apantesis along with the other species of the genera Grammia, Holarctia, and Notarctia.

References

External links
 

Arctiina
Moths described in 2007